Maria-Pia Ludovika Ulrika Elisabeth Paschaline Katharina Ignazia Lucia Johanna Josefa Kothbauer, Princess of Liechtenstein (born 6 August 1960), is the Ambassador Extraordinary and Plenipotentiary of Liechtenstein to Austria and the Czech Republic, formerly also to Belgium and the European Union. She also serves as Liechtenstein's Permanent Representative to the Organization for Security and Co-operation in Europe and to the United Nations.

Personal life 

Born in Vienna as Princess Maria-Pia of Liechtenstein, Kothbauer is the fifth child and second daughter of Prince Karl Alfred of Liechtenstein and his wife, Archduchess Agnes Christina of Austria. A member of the Princely Family of Liechtenstein, she is a first cousin of the present monarch, Prince Hans-Adam II. On 4 August 1995, she married Max Kothbauer, then vice president of Creditanstalt-Bankverein and later vice president of the Oesterreichische Nationalbank (OeNB). The couple's only child, a son named Hieronymus, was born on 26 January 1997. Since her marriage, she has been officially styled as "Her Serene Highness Maria-Pia Kothbauer, Princess of Liechtenstein".

Education and career 

Princess Maria-Pia graduated from the Schule der Dominikanerinnen, run by Dominican nuns, in Vienna in 1978. She then enrolled in Columbia University, attaining the degree of Master of Arts in Political Science.

From 1984 until 1986, she worked for the United Nations High Commissioner for Refugees, and then from 1987 until 1988 for the Foreign Department of Caritas in Vienna. Since 1989, Princess Maria-Pia has been in diplomatic service of the Principality of Liechtenstein, and started working for the Embassy of Liechtenstein in Vienna in 1990. From 1993 until 1996, she served as Liechtenstein's Ambassador to Belgium and the European Union.

In August 1996, she became Permanent Representative of the Principality of Liechtenstein in Vienna, as well as Ambassador and Head of Delegation to the Organization for Security and Co-operation in Europe (OSCE), where she is the longest-serving ambassador. In December next year, Kothbauer assumed the office of Ambassador Extraordinary and Plenipotentiary of Liechtenstein to Austria. Since July 2000, she has served as Permanent Representative of Liechtenstein to the United Nations. In April 2011, she became Ambassador Extraordinary and Plenipotentiary of Liechtenstein to the Czech Republic. She resides in Vienna.

Kothbauer speaks German, English and French, and has basic knowledge of Spanish.

Gallery

See also 

Prince Stefan of Liechtenstein - Liechtenstein's Ambassador Extraordinary and Plenipotentiary to the Holy See
Prince Nikolaus of Liechtenstein - Former Liechtenstein's Ambassador Extraordinary and Plenipotentiary to the Holy See

References 

1960 births
Living people
Ambassadors of Liechtenstein to Belgium
Ambassadors of Liechtenstein to Austria
Ambassadors of Liechtenstein to the Czech Republic
Ambassadors of Liechtenstein to the European Union
Columbia Graduate School of Arts and Sciences alumni
Maria-Pia Kothbauer
Permanent Representatives of Liechtenstein to the United Nations
Nobility from Vienna
United Nations High Commissioner for Refugees officials
Liechtenstein women diplomats
Women ambassadors
Austrian people of Portuguese descent
Liechtenstein people of Portuguese descent
Liechtenstein officials of the United Nations
Diplomats from Vienna